Lexington Avenue is  an avenue on the East Side of Manhattan in New York City.

Lexington Avenue may also refer to:
Lexington Avenue–63rd Street (63rd Street Lines), serving the  trains 
Lexington Avenue/59th Street (BMT Broadway Line), serving the  trains
Lexington Avenue-53rd Street (IND Queens Boulevard Line), serving the  trains
IRT Lexington Avenue Line, the east side trunk line serving the  trains

See also
 Lexington (disambiguation)
 Lexington Street (disambiguation)